The BBCH-scale for citrus is a classification system used in biology to describe the phenological development of citrus plants using the BBCH-scale.

The phenological growth stages and BBCH-identification keys of citrus plants are:

References

 

BBCH-scale